Fox Lake Hills is an unincorporated community and census-designated place (CDP) in Lake Villa Township, Lake County, Illinois, United States. Per the 2020 census, the population was 2,684.

Geography
Fox Lake Hills is located in northwestern Lake County at  (42.4127358, -88.1269337). It is in the western part of Lake Villa Township and is bordered to the southwest by Grant Township and to the northwest by Antioch Township. The community is on the eastern shore of Fox Lake, including parts of Columbia Bay and Stanton Bay.

Demographics

2020 census

Note: the US Census treats Hispanic/Latino as an ethnic category. This table excludes Latinos from the racial categories and assigns them to a separate category. Hispanics/Latinos can be of any race.

2000 Census
As of the census of 2000, there were 2,561 people, 893 households, and 729 families residing in the CDP. The racial makeup of the CDP was 96.25% White, 1.17% African American, 0.12% Native American, 0.59% Asian, 0.43% from other races, and 1.44% from two or more races. Hispanic or Latino of any race were 2.93% of the population.

There were 893 households, out of which 37.3% had children under the age of 18 living with them, 68.9% were married couples living together, 8.4% had a female householder with no husband present, and 18.3% were non-families. 13.2% of all households were made up of individuals, and 3.9% had someone living alone who was 65 years of age or older. The average household size was 2.87 and the average family size was 3.17.

In the CDP, the population was spread out, with 27.1% under the age of 18, 5.5% from 18 to 24, 32.2% from 25 to 44, 25.8% from 45 to 64, and 9.3% who were 65 years of age or older. The median age was 37 years. For every 100 females, there were 98.8 males. For every 100 females age 18 and over, there were 98.2 males.

The median income for a household in the CDP was $69,545, and the median income for a family was $71,711. Males had a median income of $45,363 versus $35,927 for females. The per capita income for the CDP was $27,343. About 1.2% of families and 3.0% of the population were below the poverty line, including 4.0% of those under age 18 and 8.0% of those age 65 or over.

References

Census-designated places in Illinois
Unincorporated communities in Illinois
Census-designated places in Lake County, Illinois